Chacha Vidhayak Hain Humare is an Indian comedy streaming television series created by Zakir Khan, produced by OML Production and starring Zakir Khan, Alka Amin and Zakir Hussain. It is an Amazon Prime exclusive series and premiered on 18 May 2018. The Second season of the show is released on 26 March 2021.

Plot

Season 1
Story of the series revolves around Ronny (Zakir Khan), a young lad whose life is not driven by big ambitions. All he wants is a comfortable life where he can boast about himself using convenient lies. He's the boss of his cocoon where his followers take his word for the ultimate truth, all because he pretends that his Uncle is an MLA.

Season 2
As Ronny's dream of becoming a politician starts to materialize, a tough opponent Vicky enters his life who disrupts his political ambition and personal relationships.

Cast
 Zakir Khan as Ronny Pathak: Rajesh and Amrita's son; Shanoo's brother; Vicky's enemy and Tanvi and Avantika's love interest.
 Vyom Sharma as Anwar
 Kumar Varun as Kranti "Samosa"
 Venus Singh as Avantika Sharma
 Zakir Hussain as Rajesh Pathak
 Alka Amin as Amrita Pathak
 Pritha Bakshi as Shanoo Pathak
 Abhimanyu Singh as Chachaji aka Ashwini Pathak
 Sunny Hinduja as Vicky Maheshwari (Season 2)
 Onima Kashyap as Tanvi Verma(Season 2)
 Shashie Verma as Chagan (Season 2)
 Sushil Bonthiyal as Magan (Season 2)
 Girish Sharma as the Sikh shopkeeper (Season 2)

Episodes

Season 1 (2018)

Season 2 (2021)

References

External links 
 

Amazon Prime Video original programming
2018 Indian television series debuts
Indian comedy television series
Television shows set in Madhya Pradesh
Indian political television series